Frictionless sharing refers to the transparent sharing of resources using social media services.

The term became popularised following Mark Zuckerberg's announcement at the F8 developers conference in 2011 in which he described developments to Facebook that would allow "real-time serendipity in a friction-less experience". 
Facebook applications that implemented such frictionless sharing included a news-sharing app developed by The Guardian.
The growth in importance is indicated by the ReadWrite Web article that described the development as a "top trend for 2011".

The term had previously been used in an application-independent way to describe "sharing that occurs without any additional effort required, for example, if a scholar is gathering resources for her own research, then using a social bookmarking tool is an effective tool for her as well as making the list public".

The term is separately used to refer to use of Creative Commons licences to minimise copyright barriers to reuse of content: "We also use Creative Commons licensing to allow frictionless sharing of research data, while allowing researchers to choose when and if they make data publicly available".

References 

Social media